A list of Westfield-brand shopping centres may refer to:
 List of Scentre Group properties, operations in Australia and New Zealand
 List of Unibail-Rodamco-Westfield properties, operations in Europe and the United States

Westfield
Westfield